KLEE (1480 AM) is a commercial radio station serving the Ottumwa, Iowa area. The station primarily broadcasts an oldies format. KLEE is licensed to O-Town Communications, Inc., owned by Greg List. O-Town Communications has applied for an FM translator for KLEE. The translator (K299BA) went on-air on October 28, 2014, on 107.7 MHz.

See also
KILT (AM), which used the callsign KLEE from 1948-1954.
KPRC-TV, which formerly broadcast television as KLEE-TV.

External links
KLEE website

LEE